Jorge León Flores Torres (born 11 April 1929) is a Peruvian politician and a former Congressman representing Tacna for the 2006–2011 term. He was previously a deputy representing the Tacna region from 1990 to 1992 when President Alberto Fujimori shut Congress down in a self-coup. Flores belongs to the Peruvian Aprista Party.

External links
Official Congressional Site

1929 births
Living people
American Popular Revolutionary Alliance politicians
Members of the Congress of the Republic of Peru
Members of the Chamber of Deputies of Peru